Manuel Poirier (born 17 November 1954) is a French film director and screenwriter. He has directed 15 films since 1984. His film Western won the Jury Prize at the 1997 Cannes Film Festival.

Filmography

 La première journée de Nicolas (1984)
 La lettre à Dédé (1985)
 Appartement 62 (1986)
 Sales histoires (1990)
 La petite amie d'Antonio (1992)
 ...à la campagne (1995)
 Attention, fragile (1995)
 Marion (1997)
 Western (1997)
 De la lumière quand même (2000)
 Te quiero (2001)
 Les femmes... ou les enfants d'abord... (2002)
 Chemins de traverse (2004)
 Le sang des fraises (2006)
 La maison (2007)

References

External links

1954 births
Living people
French film directors
French male screenwriters
French screenwriters